= Drepanambates =

Scientific classification
- Kingdom: Animalia
- Phylum: Arthropoda
- Clade: Pancrustacea
- Class: Insecta
- Order: Coleoptera
- Suborder: Polyphaga
- Infraorder: Cucujiformia
- Superfamily: Curculionoidea
- Family: Curculionidae
- Genus: Drepanambates; Jekel, H., 1883

Genus of weevils

Drepanambates is a genus of weevils. There are 17 species assigned to this genus, all of which are provisionally accepted:

- Drepanambates albiventris Champion, G.C., 1909
- Drepanambates amabilis Jekel, H., 1882
- Drepanambates angustatus Champion, G.C., 1907
- Drepanambates apicatus Voss, 1954
- Drepanambates belti Champion, G.C., 1909
- Drepanambates cinctus Jekel, H., 1882
- Drepanambates flavolimbatus Voss, 1953
- Drepanambates frontalis Jekel, H., 1882
- Drepanambates griseolus Jekel, H., 1882
- Drepanambates immaculatus Champion, G.C., 1907
- Drepanambates leucopleura Champion, G.C., 1909
- Drepanambates maerkeli Jekel, H., 1882
- Drepanambates modestus Kirsch, T., 1874
- Drepanambates perspicillum Jekel, H., 1882
- Drepanambates posticus Jekel, H., 1882
- Drepanambates schoenherri Jekel, H., 1882
- Drepanambates suturalis Jekel, H., 1882
